The Makwassie musk shrew (Crocidura maquassiensis) is a species of mammal in the family Soricidae. It is found in South Africa, Eswatini, and Zimbabwe. Its natural habitat is rocky areas.

References
 Baxter, R. 2004.  Crocidura maquassiensis.   2006 IUCN Red List of Threatened Species.   Downloaded on 30 July 2007.

Crocidura
Mammals described in 1946
Taxonomy articles created by Polbot